The subtropical doradito (Pseudocolopteryx acutipennis) is a species of bird in the family Tyrannidae. It is found in Argentina, Bolivia, Colombia, Ecuador, Paraguay, and Peru. Its natural habitats are subtropical or tropical moist shrubland and swamps.

References

subtropical doradito
Birds of the Andes
Birds of Argentina
Birds of Paraguay
subtropical doradito
subtropical doradito
subtropical doradito
Taxonomy articles created by Polbot